The Plough is a Grade II listed public house at 927 Hyde Road, Gorton, Manchester M18 7FB.

It is on the Campaign for Real Ale's National Inventory of Historic Pub Interiors.

It was built in the late 19th century, incorporating parts of an earlier building.

References

Grade II listed buildings in Manchester
Grade II listed pubs in Greater Manchester
Pubs in Manchester
National Inventory Pubs